Northeastern University is a university in Boston, Massachusetts, USA.

Northeastern University may also refer to:
Northeastern University (China)
Northeastern University (NEU) in Khon Kaen, Thailand

See also
Northeastern University (MBTA station), a light rail station on the campus of Northeastern University in Boston
Northeastern State University in Tahlequah, Oklahoma, USA
Northeastern Illinois University
Northeastern College (disambiguation)